Ophiogomphus anomalus, the extra-striped snaketail, is a species of dragonfly in the family Gomphidae. It is found in Canada and the United States. Its habitat is rivers.

References

Sources
 Paulson, D. R. 2007. Ophiogomphus anomalus. In: IUCN 2010. IUCN Red List of Threatened Species. Version 2010.4. <www.iucnredlist.org>. Downloaded on 5 November 2010.

Ophiogomphus
Taxonomy articles created by Polbot
Insects described in 1898